Scienova GmbH is a spin-off of Friedrich-Schiller-University, Jena, Germany, and was established by a group of scientists and management people. The innovative concept behind this company is to develop and manufacture functionalized lab disposables for the convenience of the scientific community.

One of the major innovative products from Scienova is equilibrium dialyzer developed for high-throughput ADME screenings, especially for Protein Binding Studies. It was developed by Dr. Stefan Kreusch et al. (http://video.aol.com/video-search/tag/Scienova)

External links
Website

University of Jena
Technology companies of Germany